The sicklefin smooth-hound (Mustelus lunulatus) is a houndshark of the family Triakidae.  Even some species look similar to Carcharhinus family, mustelus second dorsal fin is much bigger. It is found on the continental shelves of the eastern Pacific, between latitudes 33° N and 7° N. The difference between sharptooth smooth-hound (Mustelus dorsalis) and mustelus lunulatus, is that the lunulatus second dorsal fin origin far in advance of the anal fin. It can reach a length of up to 1.7 m (5 ft 7 in). The reproduction of this shark is ovoviviparous.

References

sicklefin smooth-hound
Fish of the Gulf of California
Fish of Mexican Pacific coast
Western Central American coastal fauna
sicklefin smooth-hound
Taxa named by David Starr Jordan